The East Azad Nagar metro station opened on 31 October 2018 and is located on the Pink Line of the Delhi Metro.

Station layout

See also
List of Delhi Metro stations
Transport in Delhi
Delhi Metro Rail Corporation
Delhi Suburban Railway

References

External links
 Delhi Metro Rail Corporation Ltd. (official site)
 Delhi Metro Annual Reports
 

Delhi Metro stations
Railway stations in Shahdara district